The Timken Company is a global manufacturer of bearings and power transmission products. Timken operates from 42 countries.

Company history

In 1898, Henry Timken obtained a patent for an improved tapered roller bearing, and in 1899 incorporated as The Timken Roller Bearing Axle Company in St. Louis.

In 1901, the company moved to Canton, Ohio, as the automobile industry began to overtake the carriage industry. Timken and his two sons chose this location because of its proximity to the American car manufacturing centers of Detroit and Cleveland and the American steel-making centers of Pittsburgh and Cleveland.

In 1917, the company began its steel- and tube-making operations in Canton to vertically integrate and maintain better control over the steel used in its bearings. World War I had created an increase in demand for steel, affecting its supply and price in the market.

Timken entered international markets in the early 1900s, establishing a presence initially in Great Britain, France and Germany. The performance of Timken tapered roller bearings in World War I military equipment made an impression on the European bearing market. After the war, Great Britain rose to the position of #2 in the global automotive manufacturing market, creating opportunities for Timken to expand its European manufacturing presence.

Timken entered the Great Depression in a strong financial position and its performance placed it in the ranks of the most solid, well-managed industrial firms of the 1930s. Expanding into non-automotive markets like agriculture, machine tooling, industrial and rail softened the impact.

During World War II, Timken production increased dramatically to keep up with wartime demand. For instance, every U.S. jeep was built using 24 Timken® bearings. With 660,000 jeeps delivered to the U.S. military, Timken delivered more than 15.8 million bearings for those vehicles over the course of the war. Following the war, much of the machinery shipped to Europe under the Marshall Plan was Timken-bearing equipped, helping Timken establish a broader presence in a bearing market where European competitors had dominated.

By 1960, Timken had operations in the U.S., Canada, Great Britain, France, South Africa, Australia and Brazil. Timken Research was created in 1966 to establish technological leadership and to help standardize research and development processes across the company.

Timken expanded into new global markets throughout the 1970s and 1980s, establishing a sales operation in Japan in 1974 and opening sales offices in Italy, Korea, Singapore and Venezuela in 1988. By the late 1990s Timken also had a sales presence in Spain, Hong Kong, China and Singapore.

Timken acquired its competitor, The Torrington Company, in 2003 for $840 million, doubling the size of the company and creating the world's third-largest bearing manufacturer at that time.

The company changed its corporate structure in 2014; the roller bearing-producing part of the company was separated from the steel-producing part of the company, resulting in two separate companies. The Timken Company continues to manufacture roller bearings, while TimkenSteel produces steel.

Company overview 
Timken is focused on expanding its tapered roller bearings and growing its offering of industrial bearings and mechanical power transmission products and services. Today the company engineers, manufactures and markets bearings, gear drives, automated lubrication systems, belts, chain, couplings and linear motion products, and offers a spectrum of powertrain rebuild and repair services. Timken engineering knowledge in metallurgy, tribology and power transmission is applied across bearings and related systems to improve the reliability and efficiency of machinery around the world. Applications range from Mars rovers to offshore wind turbines.

The Timken Company brands include: Timken bearings, Fafnir bearings, EDT bearing housed units, Lovejoy couplings and universal joints, Carlisle belts, Cone Drive worm gear drives, Drives chain, Diamond chain, Groeneveld-BEKA lubrication, Interlube lubrication systems, PT Tech industrial clutches and brakes, R+L Hydraulics hydraulic components, Rollon linear motion products and Torsion Control Products spring couplings. The company also operates Timken Power Systems, which supplies and services industrial drivetrain customers with repair, upgrade and service for bearings, gearboxes and electric motors.

Timken has a significant presence in India. The company's Indian subsidiary is called Timken India, and is publicly listed on the National Stock Exchange of India and the Bombay Stock Exchange. One of Timken India's largest customers is Indian Railways, and as of 2022, supplying to Indian Railways accounted for approximately 17% of Timken India's revenue. In 2018, Timken India acquired ABC Bearings, an Indian bearings manufacturing company.

References

External links
Company site
Jan 1945, 1947, Sep 1947 and Mar 1951 advertisements for Timken axles and brakes
Timken Locations on THOMASNET.com

Companies listed on the New York Stock Exchange
Manufacturing companies established in 1899
Companies based in Ohio
1899 establishments in Missouri
Bearing manufacturers
American brands